Stephen W. Gard is a Professor of Law at Cleveland-Marshall College of Law in Cleveland, Ohio. 
After earning his B.A. from DePauw University he went on to earn his J.D. from Indiana University (where he was an editor of the Indiana Law Review) and subsequently an LL.M. from the University of Chicago.

Professor Gard was in private practice before beginning his law teaching career at Gonzaga University. During his time at Cleveland-Marshall, he has written widely in the area of First Amendment rights. He has written briefs in cases before the United States Supreme Court and has testified before Congressional Committees on labor reform.

Gard was previously married to Connie Schultz, columnist for The Plain Dealer and wife of U.S. Senator Sherrod Brown.

External links
 Profile page at Cleveland State University

Year of birth missing (living people)
Living people
American legal scholars
DePauw University alumni
Indiana University alumni
Gonzaga University faculty
Cleveland State University faculty
University of Chicago Law School alumni